Melanie Vallejo (born 27 October 1979) is an Australian actress who is best known for portraying Madison Rocca, the Blue Mystic Ranger in Power Rangers Mystic Force, and Sophie Wong in the Australian television series Winners & Losers.

Personal life
Vallejo is a native Australian of Filipino and Ukrainian descent.

She dated her co-star Firass Dirani (Nick Russell/Mystic Red Ranger) from 2006 until 2009.

Vallejo married New Zealander Matt Kingston, an advertising planner, in June 2011. They live in New Zealand and have two children: Sonny Kingston, born October 2016, and Luna Grace, born October 2019. In 2001, she graduated from Flinders University Drama Centre.

Career
Vallejo played the role of shy Madison Rocca in Power Rangers Mystic Force. Since then, she has starred in other Australian shows, including Winners & Losers.

Filmography

Films 
 Dying Breed (2008) .... Rebecca
 The Sculptor (2009) .... Renee
 Upgrade (2018) .... Asha Trace

TV work
 All Saints (2005) .... Lynica Forbes
 Power Rangers: Mystic Force (2006) .... Madison Rocca (Blue Mystic Ranger)
 Packed to the Rafters (2008) .... Kat Ripley
 Dance Academy (2010) .... Dana Strong
 Winners & Losers (2011–2016) .... Sophie Wong
 Australia's Cheapest Weddings .... Narrator

Theatre
 The Return (2002–2003) .... Lisa, productions at Adelaide Fringe Festival, Adelaide Come Out Festival, Edinburgh Festival Fringe
 Gosling (2003) .... Sydney Theatre Company production
 Myth, Propaganda and Disaster in Nazi Germany & Contemporary America (2003 and 2005) .... Marguerite, Sydney Theatre Company production
 Morph (2004) .... Grace Black, Adelaide Fringe Festival production
 Baghdad Wedding (2009) .... Luma, Belvoir St Theatre production

References

External links 
 
 Filmography (maintained by her theatrical agency)

1979 births
Australian people of Filipino descent
Australian people of Ukrainian descent
Australian television actresses
Australian stage actresses
Australian film actresses
Living people